The High Commission of Tonga in London is the diplomatic mission of Tonga in the United Kingdom. Tonga and the United Kingdom established diplomatic relations in June 1970 after the Treaty of Friendship and Tonga's protection status ended.

The Tongan High Commission is located on 36 Moyneux Street in Marylebone, London.

Gallery

See also

 List of diplomatic missions of Tonga
 List of High Commissioners of the United Kingdom to Tonga

References

Tonga
Tonga–United Kingdom relations
Buildings and structures in the City of Westminster
Tonga and the Commonwealth of Nations
United Kingdom and the Commonwealth of Nations